The Vicesima libertatis, also known as the Vicesima Manumissionum was an ancient Republican Roman tax on freed slaves. If the master freed the slave the government would tax the master for 5% of the slaves value. If the slave freed themselves they would be taxed. Another possibility is that the tax was for registering a slave as free, not for freeing them in the first place. It was established in 357 BCE by the Consul Gnaeus Manlius. There is no archaeological evidence for this tax in all provinces except for Italy before the Severan dynasty.

References 

Slavery in ancient Rome
Taxation in ancient Rome